Capital punishment is a legal punishment in Tennessee.

Legal process
When the prosecution seeks the death penalty, the sentence is decided by the jury and must be unanimous.

In case of a hung jury during the penalty phase of the trial, a life sentence is issued, even if only a single juror opposed death (there is no retrial).

The method of execution is lethal injection, but a prisoner condemned before 1 January 1999 may choose to be electrocuted instead. Electrocution is also provided if lethal injection is held unconstitutional or if any drug necessary to carry it out is unavailable through no fault of the Tennessee Department of Correction. If electrocution is held unconstitutional, state statutes then provide the use of "any constitutional method of execution".

Capital crimes
First degree-murder can be punished by death when it involves any of the following aggravating factors:
 The murder was committed against a person less than 12 years of age;
 The defendant was previously convicted of one or more felonies, other than the present charge, whose statutory elements involve the use of violence to the person;
 The defendant knowingly created a great risk of death to two or more persons, other than the victim murdered, during the act of murder;
 The defendant committed the murder for remuneration or the promise of remuneration, or employed another to commit the murder for remuneration or the promise of remuneration;
 The murder was especially heinous, atrocious, or cruel, in that it involved torture or serious physical abuse beyond that necessary to produce death;
 The murder was committed for the purpose of avoiding, interfering with, or preventing a lawful arrest or prosecution of the defendant or another;
 The murder was knowingly committed, solicited, directed, or aided by the defendant, while the defendant had a substantial role in committing or attempting to commit, or was fleeing after having a substantial role in committing or attempting to commit, any first degree murder, arson, rape, robbery, burglary, theft, kidnapping, aggravated child abuse, aggravated child neglect, rape of a child, aggravated rape of a child, aircraft piracy, or unlawful throwing, placing or discharging of a destructive device or bomb;
 The murder was committed by the defendant while the defendant was in lawful custody or in a place of lawful confinement or during the defendant's escape from lawful custody or from a place of lawful confinement;
 The murder was committed against any law enforcement officer, corrections official, corrections employee, probation and parole officer, emergency medical or rescue worker, emergency medical technician, paramedic or firefighter, who was engaged in the performance of official duties, and the defendant knew or reasonably should have known that the victim was a law enforcement officer, corrections official, corrections employee, probation and parole officer, emergency medical or rescue worker, emergency medical technician, paramedic or firefighter engaged in the performance of official duties;
 The murder was committed against any present or former judge, district attorney general or state attorney general, assistant district attorney general or assistant state attorney general, due to or because of the exercise of the victim's official duty or status and the defendant knew that the victim occupied such office;
 The murder was committed against a national, state, or local popularly elected official, due to or because of the official's lawful duties or status, and the defendant knew that the victim was such an official;
 The defendant committed "mass murder" which is defined as the murder of three or more persons, whether committed during a single criminal episode or at different times within a forty-eight-month period;
 The defendant knowingly mutilated the body of the victim after death;
 The victim of the murder was 70 years of age or older; or the victim of the murder was particularly vulnerable due to a significant handicap or significant disability, whether mental or physical, and at the time of the murder the defendant knew or reasonably should have known of such handicap or disability;
 The murder was committed in the course of an act of terrorism; or
 The murder was committed against a pregnant woman, and the defendant intentionally killed the victim, knowing that she was pregnant.

Current status

Tennessee has carried out thirteen executions since the reinstatement of the death penalty: one in 2000 under governor Don Sundquist, five from 2006 to 2009 under governor Phil Bredesen, three during the final months of Bill Haslam’s second term, including Edmund Zagorski, and four so far under Bill Lee. The first execution during Bredesen's governorship was that of Sedley Alley, sentenced to death for the rape, torture and murder of 19-year old U.S. Marine Corps Lance Corporal Suzanne Marie Collins. Her parents were notable advocates of expediting the death penalty appeal process. 

, 49 condemned prisoners are incarcerated on the state's death row. The Tennessee Supreme Court sets execution dates. The Governor alone decides whether to grant or deny clemency; the Tennessee Board of Probation and Parole makes a recommendation in each case but the Governor is not required to follow the Board's recommendation. Executions take place at the Riverbend Maximum Security Institution in Nashville at 7pm (the time was 1am until 2009 and 10am from 2009-2018).

In 2007, Tennessee established by legislation a Committee to Study the Administration of the Death Penalty. After 16 months of analysis and hearings, the study committee on the death penalty suggested reform of the death penalty without abolishing it, including the creation of an independent authority to review death sentences.

Of the two women sentenced to death, Gaile Owens was pardoned in July 2010, owing to a sentence deemed "disproportionate" (she was convicted in 1986 for having killed her husband who beat her). The second woman, Christa Pike, who was convicted in 1996 for having tortured to death a fellow Job Corps dormitory resident, remains on death row.

In 2023, Tennessee was debating about using firing squad.

Early history
In Tennessee, hanging was a legal method of execution until 1913, when executions were suspended for two years. In 1915, the electric chair was introduced and used for 45 years. Between 1960 and 2000, the death penalty however was not applied in Tennessee. The death penalty was reinstated there in 1975, but executions did not resume until 2000, with the lethal injection that had become a legal method of execution at the end of this period. However, those sentenced to death before January 1, 1999 can request to be executed in the electric chair. Faced with difficulties in acquiring the drugs needed for lethal injections, Tennessee law was amended in 2014 to once more permit electrocution as a backup method, in case of any problems with acquiring the drugs needed for lethal injections.

See also
 List of people executed in Tennessee
 List of death row inmates in Tennessee
 Crime in Tennessee

References

External links
 Tennessee Department of Correction: Death Row Offenders

 
Tennessee
Crime in Tennessee
Tennessee law